Jack McLean may refer to:

Jack McLean (ice hockey) (1923–2003), Canadian ice hockey player
Jack McLean (mayor), American politician and mayor
Jack McLean (rugby) (1923–2005), New Zealand rugby (union and league) footballer

See also
John McLean (disambiguation)